An alfajor or alajú (plural alfajores) is a traditional confection typically made of flour, honey, and nuts.  It is found in Paraguay, Argentina, the Philippines, Southern Brazil, Southern France, Spain, Uruguay, Peru, Ecuador, Colombia and Chile. The archetypal alfajor entered Iberia during the period of al-Andalus. It is produced in the form of a small cylinder and is sold either individually or in boxes containing several pieces.

Etymology
According to Spanish philologist and dialectologist Manuel Alvar López, alfajor is an Andalusian variant of the Castilian alajú, derived from the Arabic word , al-fakhir, meaning luxurious, and, contrary to some beliefs that it originated in the New World, was introduced to Latin America as alfajor. The word had been introduced into Spanish dictionaries in the 14th century.

The publication of historical dictionaries of the Spanish language allows one to document both forms of the original alajur, written as alajú and alfajor. Alajur and multiple geographic variations are sweets made of a paste of almonds, nuts, breadcrumbs and honey. It is possible that alfajor and alajú were Arabisms introduced into the Spanish language in different places and times, and, supposing both came from the same etymology, from a linguistic point of view, alajú is probably an Arabism of Castillian Spanish, and so it is still alive in Cuenca, Toledo, Guadalajara and in la Sierra de la peña de Francia; meanwhile the variation alfajor is Andalusian and Murcian. In the Americas, the word alfajor was not known until the 19th century.

History
In 712, the Arab general Musa ibn Nusair arrived in Algeciras with an army of 18,000 soldiers to undertake the conquest of Medina Sidonia, Alcalá de Guadaira and Carmona. A similar sweet called alaú is found in the Arabic-Hispanic cookbook Kitab al-Tabikh, by an anonymous author. The Spanish grammarian Nebrija noted the word for the first time in his Latin-Spanish Dictionary (1495) as: alfaxor or alaxur. In the 12th century, Raimundo Martin describes in his book Vocabulista another possible etymology of the Hispano-Arabic fasur, meaning "nectar".

Preparation and presentation
The regulations of the Andalusian Ministry of Agriculture allow the use of only pure honey, almonds, nuts, breadcrumbs, sugar, flour and spices, such as aniseed, sesame, cilantro, cloves and cinnamon. The Protected Geographical Indication alfajores are meant to be presented in a cylindrical shape, with a minimum weight of 30 grams each, and with a minimum size of about 7 cm in length and a diameter of 1.5 cm. Each of them will be protected with a wrapping paper, and the ends made an ornament in a spiral shape with a ribbon out of the same paper. Once individually wrapped, they may be packaged in wood or cardboard boxes, but never in plastic.

Europe

In Spain

In Spain, there are a variety of different recipes for preparing alfajores, but the most traditional contain flour, honey, almonds and several spices, such as cinnamon. Alfajores are most commonly sold around Christmas, but in Medina Sidonia, they are available year-round. The traditional Spanish alfajor has been produced in this town (where it is called an alajú) since ancient times, and the recipe has been traditionally handed down from father to son.

Alfajores are still made by craftsmen in Medina Sidonia using natural ingredients that include honey, almonds, hazelnuts, sugar, flour, and breadcrumbs, and mixed with natural spices. The manufacturing process has been respected following a recipe found by Mariano Pardo de Figueroa in 1786. In Medina Sidonia, the annual production of approximately 45,000 kilograms is mostly consumed in the province of Cadiz, but they are also famous in Sevilla, Malaga and Huelva.

On 15 September 2004, protected geographical indication was ratified by the Consejo de agricultura y pesca de la junta de Andalucía and published in the Official Journal of the European Union as Alfajor de Medina Sidonia on 6 March 2007.

In the province of Cuenca, Spain, where the alfajor is called alajú it is made with almond, honey and figs, all wrapped in a wafer.
Medina Sidonia was the capital for the Arabic world of confection, where the alfajor has centuries of history with a recipe that has been transmitted from generation to generation. In this town, there is an account of Mariano Pardo de Figueroa, a gastronomist better known by his pseudonym Doctor Thebussem, who documented the history of this sweet, wherein he wrote that on 2 July 1487, Enrique de Guzmán, second count of Medina Sidonia, ordered the council and majors of the region to send to Malaga 50 cows, 50 oxen, 200 calves and provision of alajú from his city.

The recipe documented by the accounts of Thebussem in the 19th century is defined as the following:

In France 
The sweet sandwich cookie sold and largely consumed in France is the macaron. This typical Parisian confection is presented with a ganache, buttercream or jam filling sandwiched between two cookies, akin to a sandwich cookie. This meringue-based sweet should not be considered a counterpart of the Alfajor in France. Both sweet pastries are extremely similar in shape; nevertheless, the method and ingredients of the confection differ significantly. The alfajor is made with a biscuit base, whose dough, whether made of corn-starch or flour, is usually more compact and solid. Instead, the macaron is made with meringue, which can be Italian or French.

In the Americas

In the Caribbean
In Puerto Rico, they underwent creolization, lost their almond and gained ground cassava. They can take varying amounts of sugar and spices. It's possible that Puerto Rico's most common version of this dessert (South American version with dulce de leche) reached Puerto Rico from Venezuela, but the opposite is also possible. Depending on region some add cornstarch, citrus zest, ginger and honey, filled with chocolate, vanilla cream, dulce de leche, fruit paste, or coconut. The filling can be mixed with almonds, sesame seeds, coconut flakes, or sprinkles.
Traditional "alfajores" in Argentina, Peru, Uruguay and Venezuela consist of two round, sweet biscuits made of wheat flour or corn starch joined with dulce de leche (known as "manjar blanco" in Peru and as "arequipe" in Venezuela), and optionally coated with powdered sugar. More modern "industrial" varieties in Uruguay and Argentina, are coated with dark or white chocolate (many alfajores are sold in "black" and "white" versions), or simply covered with powdered sugar. These are also known as a Chilean Oreo. One variation is called "alfajor de nieve" (snow alfajor) and has a white coating consisting of a mixture of egg whites and sugar. Most alfajores come packaged in aluminium foil. Alfajores are made in various diameters and are consumed as snacks.

In South America

Alfajores have been popular in Argentina and Uruguay since the mid-19th century. However, these differ from the Spanish alfajores in that they are made with two round cookies with different sweet fillings between them. The filling is usually dulce de leche, although there are a lot of variations. They can be covered with powder sugar (the traditional ones), glazed sugar (Santafesinos or "de nieve"), grated coconut or chocolate. Argentina is one of the world's largest consumer of alfajores, both in total numbers and in per capita calculations, actually consuming more than a billion alfajores a year, while being the most common snack for schoolchildren and adults. 

Some of the best-known alfajor brands in South America are the Argentine "Jorgito", "Capitán del Espacio", "Guaymallen", "Suchard", "Havanna", "Cachafaz", "Juanote" and "Estancia El Rosario", the Uruguayan "Punta Ballena", "Sierra de Minas", "Alfajores Portezuelo", "Marley", and Peruvian "Casa del Alfajor".

In Argentina 
The alfajor has been manufactured and consumed since colonial times in the territories that today belong to Argentina.

Industrial alfajor 
Mass-production of alfajores traces back to the Atlantic coast of Argentina in the 1950s. Brands such as Havanna and Balcarce, and as many as 30 others, have been introduced into shops and supermarkets. Statistics of the year 2021 shows that inhabitants of Argentina consume 6 million alfajores per day. Supermarkets carry a wide variety of product, up to 34 different kinds. These include "triple alfajores", which are composed of three biscuits adhered to one another with dulce de leche and covered with chocolate.

Regional 
Around 1851 in the district of Arocena (province of Santa Fe), Manuel Zampatti, known as Zapatin, began commercially manufacturing an existing variety of alfajor consisting of three baked cookies adhered with dulce de leche and coated with sugar. These came to be known as "alfajor santafesino". Colonel Néstor Fernández took it to the battle of Caseros, and was there when the army tasted it and it became so popular that General Justo José de Urquiza had alfajores taken to his San José de Entre Ríos farm with a weekly load of these alfajores. They are also manufactured in the provinces of Santiago del Estero and Tucumán, and the famous brand Havanna manufactures them in the city of Mar del Plata and in most of the tourist places of Argentina.

The Cordobes alfajor stands out among the regional varieties of Argentina; it is filled with jellies of fruits (generally of quince), one of the most well - known brands is Estancia El Rosario. Other outstanding variety is the alfajor from Santa Fe which has no less than three puff pastry covers adhered to one another with much dulce de leche and everything glazed (Industrial preparations can be differentiated because they are not coated in the lower part, since the coating is made in plates). In addition, In Santa Fe, it can be acquired the Rogel, of similar characteristics, but bigger (the size of a small cake) and the variety from Tucuman, which is known as a clarita and it is made up with two crunchy cookies as covers and filled with a jelly made up of sugar molasses. In Argentina, alfajores made up of cornflour are very consumed as well (covers made up of maize starch, filled with dulce de leche and grated coconut around the joining).

In Peru 
Alfajores made their arrival to the Viceroyalty of Peru, the largest administrative district of the Spanish Empire in South America in the 16th century, and have been popular since, especially the artisanal types.

In Chile 
The cornflour alfajor is consumed during the whole year in the central areas of Chile; on the other hand, in the southern areas of Chile, it is consumed another variety of alfajor, generally for Patriotic festivities of September.

The alfajor is basically a sponge cake or cookies adhered with manjar (dulce de leche) and generally coated in meringue or marmalade and optionally with sprinkled icing sugar. Two types of alfajores are mainly outstanding in Chile:

 The first type of alfajor, similar to the one of corn flour prepared in other countries of Latin America, is prepared over all the territory of Chile, and mainly in the central area of Chile, where it is a traditional candy. It is known with other names as "candy of corn flour" or the typical "chilenitos". The chilenitos are manufactured with corn flour or other types of flour and tend to be simpler and smaller than the typical alfajores.
 The second type of alfajor, considered the true traditional alfajor of the country and known as "chilean alfajor", is mainly prepared in the southern areas of Chile. Unlike the traditional alfajores of corn flour, it stands out because it is prepared with two hojarascas (kind of thin and firm cookie) that, since they are previously baked, acquire a curved form in their extremes. They are adhered to each other with dark brown sugar, panela, manjar or with confectioners cream (if they are filled with dark brown sugar, the hojarascas are a little bit thicker and flatter than those filled with manjar). Optionally, they can be garnished in the end of the filling with grated coconut as it is the case of the alfajores filled with manjar or with ground nuts.

Guinness World Record: the biggest South American alfajor
According to Guinness World Records, the biggest alfajor in the world, measuring almost two meters in diameter and 80 centimeters in height and weighing 464 kilograms, was made on 11 December 2010 in Minas, Lavalleja Department, Uruguay. The giant alfajor was made to mark the celebration of Uruguay's first National Alfajor Festival. More than 30 people participated in the preparation of the record-breaking alfajor.

Gallery

See also

Wagon Wheel (Commonwealth), Choco pie (Korea), and Moon pie (United States), similar snacks with a marshmallow filling
Macaron, a similar French confection
Mille-feuille, a French confection of layered pastry and cream
Baklava, a Middle-Eastern confection of layered pastry and honey
Pirouline, a cream-filled tubular wafer cookie
 List of desserts

References

External links

Spanish desserts
French desserts
Argentine desserts
Chilean desserts
Mexican desserts
Paraguayan desserts
Peruvian desserts
Uruguayan desserts
Andalusian cuisine
Desserts
Spanish products with protected designation of origin
Philippine desserts
Bolivian cuisine
Colombian cuisine
Ecuadorian cuisine
Puerto Rican cuisine
Confectionery